University Center is a census-designated place (CDP) in Loudoun County, Virginia, United States. The population as of the 2010 United States Census was 3,586. Mailing addresses in the community are for Ashburn.

Geography
The University Center CDP is in eastern Loudoun County, on the north side of Virginia State Route 7 (Harry Byrd Highway). Ashburn is to the south, across Route 7, and Montgomery County, Maryland, borders the CDP across the Potomac.

References

Census-designated places in Loudoun County, Virginia
Washington metropolitan area
Census-designated places in Virginia